Hunter is a town in West Grand Bahama in The Bahamas. It is southwest of the islands' largest city, Freeport City.

References 
Commonwealth of the Bahamas website

Populated places in the Bahamas